LaGuardia is a four-issue Africanfuturist comic book limited series by Nigerian-American writer Nnedi Okorafor and artist Tana Ford. The series was published by Dark Horse Comics imprint Berger Books from December 2018–March 2019, when it was also reprinted in a collected trade paperback format.

The series takes place in the same universe as Okorafor's Lagoon and Binti trilogy. 
The story was inspired by Okorafor's own experience with TSA at LaGuardia Airport.
In 2020, the collected trade won an Eisner Award and a Hugo Award.

Plot 
Characters
Future Nwafor Chukwuebuka
Letme Live
Citizen Raphael Nwabara
Future Citizen Lives Chukwebuka

Development

Reception 
The comic series was well received by critics scoring an average rating of 9.2 for the entire series based on 13 critic reviews aggregated by Comic Book Roundup.  It received a starred review from Library Journal where Michael Dudley praised the glowing colors and found that although the characters were not subtle, the real-world story of the problems faced by immigrants was "both humanist and hopeful." Publishers Weekly called the art "wittily illustrated" and also found the colors vivid, ultimately comparing it to the best sci-fi for the story's handling of contemporary debates on immigration policy.

Accolades 
In July 2020, the collected book won the Eisner Award for Best Graphic Album: Reprint, and shortly afterwards won the Hugo Award for Best Graphic Story in August 2020.

Collected editions

References 

Dark Horse Comics limited series
Eisner Award winners for Best Graphic Album: Reprint
Hugo Award for Best Graphic Story-winning works
Works by Nnedi Okorafor